Veeravaram village is located in Kadiam mandal of East Godavari district in Andhra Pradesh state, India.

Geography 

Climate 
The weather is hot and humid, with a tropical climate and, thereby, no distinct seasons. The mean maximum temperature is 32 °C. The hottest season is from April to June, with temperature ranging from 34 °C to 48 °C with maximum of 51 °C recorded in May 2002 and May 2007. The coolest months are December and January, when it is pleasant at 27 °C to 30 °C. There is heavy monsoon rain at the end of summer, with depressions in the Bay of Bengal.

References

Villages in Kadiam mandal